Bartali: The Iron Man is a 2006 Italian television film co-written and directed by Alberto Negrin.

The film depicts real life events of road racing cyclist Gino Bartali, and particularly his rivality with Fausto Coppi.

Plot

Cast  
Pierfrancesco Favino as Gino Bartali
Nicole Grimaudo as  Adriana Bani Bartali
 Simone Gandolfo as  Fausto Coppi
Francesco Salvi as  Eberardo Pavesi
 Rodolfo Corsato as  Alfredo Binda
Carlo Giuffré as  Cardinal Elia Dalla Costa
Edoardo Gabbriellini as Giulio Bartali 
 Giuseppe Gandini  as  Berti
 Emilio Bonucci as  Signor Zambrini
 Franco Castellano  as  Mario Carità 
 Gianna Giachetti as Giulia Bartali
Sandro Ghiani as  Amedeo Bani
 Christian Ginepro as  Aldo Bini
 Edoardo Natoli as Giorgio Bani
 Bruno Vetti as  Torello Bartali
 Stefano Brusa as  Serse Coppi
 Enrica Rosso as  Cesarina Bani
 Valentina Bruscoli as Giulia Occhini 
 Vittorio Amandola as Father Berti
 Pierre Lucat as  Louison Bobet

References

External links

2006 television films
2006 films
Italian television films
2006 biographical drama films
Films set in Italy
Italian biographical drama films
Biographical films about sportspeople
Cultural depictions of Italian men
Cultural depictions of cyclists
Cycling films
Films scored by Ennio Morricone
Films directed by Alberto Negrin
2006 drama films
2000s Italian films